The Canadian Classique, also known as the 401 Derby and the Two Solitudes Derby, is a soccer rivalry between Canadian clubs, Toronto FC and CF Montréal (formerly the Montreal Impact). The rivalry gets the "401" nickname from Ontario Highway 401, which forms most of the standard driving route between the two cities (with the remainder being Quebec Autoroute 20), as well as the Two Solitudes book and cultural phenomenon. It is a tense rivalry, stemming from other sporting rivalries between Toronto and Montreal.

History

Early history
The first professional soccer clubs to be played in either Toronto or Montreal were the Toronto Metros and Montreal Olympique, who both began play in 1971. The two teams played infrequently due to consistent relocation and expansion/contraction in the old North American Soccer League. Throughout the 1980s, different teams from both respective metropolises formed and folded, rarely aligned with one another at the same season.

In 1992, the original Montreal Impact side formed by the Saputo family, following the demise of Montreal Supra and its league (the Canadian Soccer League). They became a dominant club in the American Professional Soccer League (1993–1996) and the A-League (1997–2003), renamed the USL First Division (2004). The team did not compete during the 1999 A-League season. Their main rivals were the Rochester Rhinos and the Toronto Lynx prior to the latter's move to the USL Premier Development League.

Pre-MLS era
The modern day rivalry involving Toronto FC came into fruition during the first ever Canadian Championship, Canada's domestic cup competition that was formed in 2008. The tournament is used as well to determine Canada's sole berth into the CONCACAF Champions League. It was the 2008 edition of the tournament where Montreal and Toronto played their first competitive game against one another. Played on May 27, 2008, Toronto emerged victorious 1–0 over  thanks to a Marco Vélez goal in the 72nd minute in front of a crowd of 12,303 at Saputo Stadium. Toronto, being the lone MLS team in the tournament, despite being an expansion franchise, was expected to ultimately win the tournament. Ultimately, though, the Impact ended up winning the three-way tournament, against Toronto and Vancouver Whitecaps, achieving the first Canadian Championship after posting a 2–1–1 record. The title was clinched by Montreal against Toronto on Toronto's home ground, BMO Field. The 1–1 draw which gave Montreal the title on Toronto's home soil further fueled the rivalry. By winning that title, Montreal earned a berth into the 2008–09 CONCACAF Champions League where they reached the quarterfinals.

Toronto got revenge on the Montreal at the following Canadian Championship by scoring six unanswered goals in a come-from-behind 6–1 win at Saputo Stadium. Toronto captain, Dwayne De Rosario netted a hat trick in the match. The match also secured Toronto's place in the 2009–10 CONCACAF Champions League, where they were eliminated in the preliminary round of the tournament. The Reds continued their reign of dominance in the 2010 edition of the Canadian Championship, beating Montreal in both the home and away legs of the competition, tallying an aggregate score of 3–0 during that time. With the arrival of FC Edmonton, the 2011 edition of the competition did not see the Impact and Reds meet each other.

MLS era
It was around this time that it was announced that the Impact would be "promoted" to Major League Soccer at the start of the 2012. The announcement officially came from MLS commissioner, Don Garber and the Saputo family on May 7, 2010. On June 14, 2011, the Montreal Impact announced a five-year agreement with the Bank of Montreal to become their lead sponsor and jersey sponsor in MLS, the same kit sponsor of Toronto.

Montreal and Toronto played their first MLS competition on April 7, 2012. Played in front of a crowd of 24,000 at Olympic Stadium, the Impact emerged victorious, 2–1, over the Reds. Bosnian Siniša Ubiparipović netted the opening goal of the derby in MLS competitions, scoring for Montreal in the 18th minute. Andrew Wenger, the first pick of the 2012 MLS SuperDraft, netted in the 81st minute to give the Impact the game-winning goal. Dutch international Danny Koevermans netted a consolation goal for Toronto in the 88th minute.

In 2013, the Reds and Impact split the series 1–1–1. A crowd of 38,000 was on hand to watch the first match of the 2013 series, where Montreal won 2–1. Additionally, in 2013, the Impact won their first Canadian Championship since joining MLS. During their 2013 Canadian Championship run, the Impact defeated Toronto by a 6–0 scoreline, to date, the largest margin of victory in the derby history.

On April 24, 2013, Justin Braun became the first player to play for both sides of the derby, after he was traded from Montreal to Toronto over the winter break. Collen Warner repeated the feat in 2014 after being traded to Toronto for Issey Nakajima-Farran, who had never played against Montreal before the exchange. Dominic Oduro (2015) and Kyle Bekker (2016) later joined the turncoat club, both playing for Toronto before Montreal. Canadian goalkeeper Greg Sutton played for both the NASL edition of the Montreal Impact and for Toronto FC, but only ever played for the Reds in derby matches. No player has ever scored a goal for both teams in derby matches.

October 29, 2015, was the first time that the teams met in the MLS Cup Playoffs. The match at Saputo Stadium ended 3–0 in favour of the Impact. It also marked Toronto's first appearance in the playoffs in their history, and Montreal's second-ever playoff game. The two teams faced off again for the second consecutive time in the 2016 MLS Cup Playoffs in two games as both Toronto and Montreal defeated New York City FC and New York Red Bulls respectively, making the rivalry part of the Eastern Conference Finals. Montreal won the first leg of the Conference Championship, 3–2 at the Olympic Stadium in Montreal on November 22. Toronto later beat Montreal 5–2 in extra time in the return leg at BMO Field in Toronto on November 30, winning on an aggregated score of 7–5, making Toronto FC the first Canadian team to compete in an MLS Cup Final.

On February 24, 2016, both Montreal and Toronto played together for the first time outside of Canada, with the teams playing together for the Suncoast Invitational. The match played in the Joe DiMaggio Sports Complex in Clearwater, Florida ended with a 1–1 tie. Toronto played as the home team in this match.

In 2020, both Toronto and Montreal played in the MLS is Back Tournament where Toronto and Montreal both played in Group C along with New England Revolution and D.C. United. Toronto defeated Montreal 3–4 where Montreal played as the home team although both teams ended up advancing to the knockout stage. Neither teams did not meet each other after the round of 16 as both teams were defeated in the round of 16.

After the tournament, the teams returned to Canada to play additional matches with each other to compete in the qualifying round of the 2020 Canadian Championship before playing the remainder of the matches in the United States. On the first leg of the rivalry, Toronto defeated Montreal 0–1 in Montreal's home match while Montreal defeated Toronto 0–1 while competing against Toronto in the second leg. The third leg gave Toronto another win in Montreal, defeating Montreal 1–2. After three additional games with Vancouver, two of which were wins against Vancouver, Toronto were qualified for the Canadian Championship.

In 2021, COVID-19 cross-border restrictions imposed by the Canadian government forced both Toronto and Montreal to play their home matches for the 2021 MLS season in the United States since the start of the season, while also sharing stadiums with other American MLS Teams. Both teams play together at Inter Miami CF's stadium DRV PNK Stadium in Fort Lauderdale, Florida on April 17, 2021, where Montreal (playing as the home team in this match) win against Toronto 4-2 behind closed doors. On July 23, MLS announced that the upcoming rivalry match scheduled to take place August 27 along with other home matches of both teams for that month would be played in Canada.

Supporters 

Off the field, there is intense rivalry between the supporters groups of Toronto and Montreal. Toronto's prominent supporters' groups are U-Sector and Red Patch Boys. In addition to Toronto FC; the U-Sector also support the Canadian national team, and the TFC Academy teams. Additionally, the club is supported by several other supporter's groups including Original 109 who sit in Section 109 of BMO Field, SG114 who sit in Section 114, and the Tribal Rhythm Nation who represent the African, Caribbean and Latin American communities in the Greater Toronto Area.

The largest, and oldest supporters group for Montreal is Ultras Montréal, who are also known as UM02, for the year the supporters club was founded (2002). Additionally, Montreal are supported by 127 Montréal. 127 Montréal formed in 2011, around the time the Montreal Impact were in transition from NASL to MLS. In 2011, the Montreal Impact Supporters Association was created to better facilitate the relations between the Club and the Supporters Groups, to promote the supporters culture, and to help with the financing of different supporter group initiatives. Moreover, Montreal is supported by 1642 Montreal, for the year of the foundation of Montreal. 1642 Montreal is known to ring a bell of 0.8 ton to celebrate any goal scored by the team.

Joint sponsorship 
The Bank of Montreal, which has offices in both Toronto and Montreal, are the primary sponsors of both teams since both teams started playing in the MLS in 2007 and 2011 respectively. It also has naming rights to Toronto FC's home stadium, BMO Field.

Stadium 

Both Toronto and Montreal play in soccer-specific stadiums and have been doing so for their entire existence. BMO Field is Toronto FC's home stadium, while Saputo Stadium serves as home ground for CF Montréal. For marquee matchups, such as games against acclaimed opponents, rivals, or Champions League fixtures, as well as winter-time matches, both teams sometimes play in larger, indoor stadiums in their respective region. Toronto FC have played several games at Rogers Centre while CF Montréal have played their share of games at Olympic Stadium, which is within walking distance of Saputo Stadium.

Toronto's BMO Field is located in Exhibition Place of the city, near the banks of Lake Ontario. Saputo Stadium is located along the border of Montreal's Rosemont-La Petite-Patrie district and Parc Olympique district. BMO Field currently sits 30,991 (21,566 before May 2015) while Saputo Stadium currently seats 20,521.

Results

Statistics 
For statistical purposes, this table includes the NASL edition of the Montreal Impact.

Records 

  Most goals in a match
 8 goals on September 20, 2017  Toronto 3–5 Montreal
 7 goals on June 18, 2009  Montreal 1–6 Toronto
 7 goals on November 30, 2016  Toronto 5–2 Montreal
 7 goals on July 16, 2020  Montreal 3–4 Toronto
 7 goals on September 4, 2022Toronto 3–4 Montreal

 Margin of victory
 Montreal:
 Montreal 6–0 Toronto on May 1, 2013
 Montreal 3–0 Toronto on October 29, 2015

 Toronto:
 Montreal 1–6 Toronto on June 18, 2009
 Toronto 4–0 Montreal on June 22, 2022
 Montreal 0–3 Toronto on June 27, 2012
 Toronto 5–2 Montreal on November 30, 2016

 Most consecutive wins
 Toronto FC: 4

Top goalscorers 

Players in bold are still active players with the team.

Players who played for both clubs

Toronto, then Montreal
 Kyle Bekker
 Raheem Edwards
 Daniel Lovitz
 Issey Nakajima-Farran
 Dominic Oduro
 Maximiliano Urruti

Montreal, then Toronto
 Justin Braun
 Adam Braz
 Laurent Ciman
 Ali Gerba
 Greg Sutton
 Collen Warner

See also

References 

Toronto FC
CF Montréal
Major League Soccer rivalries
Soccer in Ontario
Soccer in Quebec
Soccer rivalries in Canada
2008 establishments in Ontario
2008 establishments in Quebec
Nicknamed sporting events